Thor Haakon Knudsen (30 May 1927 – 10 January 2006) was a Norwegian politician for the Conservative Party.

He was born in Tønsberg.

During the cabinet Borten he worked as a State Secretary in the Ministry of Defence from January 26 1970 – January 31 1971. He was elected to the Norwegian Parliament from Vestfold in 1977, and was re-elected on two occasions. He was President of the Lagting from 1981 to 1989.

A journalist by education, he worked in Tønsberg Blad from 1949 to 1956, in the Conservative Party Press Bureau from 1956 to 1970 and as editor-in-chief of Sandefjords Blad from 1971 to 1977. He was a member of the board of Norsk Telegrambyrå from 1971 to 1980.

He was also a member of the Norwegian riksmål association, Rotary, the Norwegian Atlantic Committee and the European Movement, and presided the Norges Forsvarsforening from 1989 to 1995.

References

1927 births
2006 deaths
Members of the Storting
Norwegian state secretaries
Conservative Party (Norway) politicians
Politicians from Tønsberg
20th-century Norwegian politicians